The M110 engine family is a DOHC (double overhead cam) crossflow cylinder head design with 2 valves per cylinder straight-6 automobile engine made by Mercedes-Benz in the 1970s and 1980s.

The M110.92x and .93x engines are carburetor engines, with Solex 4A1 carburetor.

The M110.98x and .99x engines are fuel-injected engines, with Bosch D-Jetronic up to the .983 and K-Jetronic from the .984.

Firing order is 1-5-3-6-2-4. Lubrication system was pressure circulation lubrication system. Number of valves was 1 intake, 1 exhaust with V-shaped overhead configuration, acted by rocker arms. Valve operation was 2 top camshafts and camshaft drive was duplex roller-type chain.

The M110 .92x and .93x carburetor engines were replaced by the SOHC 2.6L M103 while .98x and .99x fuel-injected engines were replaced by 3.0L M103 starting in 1986.

M110.921 / M110.931
The .931 is the low-compression version of the .921. 
Power output of .921:  at 5500 rpm.
Power output of .931:  at 5500 rpm.

Applications:
 1972-1976 280 (W114)
 1972-1976 280C (W114)

M110.922 / M110.932
The .932 is the low-compression version of the .922.

Power output of .922:  at 5500 rpm.
Power output of .932:  at 5500 rpm.

Applications:
 1972-1980 280S (W116)

M110.923

Applications:
 1975-1981 280 (W123)
 1975-1981 280C (W123)

M110.924

Applications:
 1979-1985 280S (W126)

M110.926

Applications:
 1979-1985 280S (W126)

M110.981 / M110.991
The M110.981 uses Bosch D-Jetronic injection. This system senses the ambient temperature, engine temperature, intake manifold underpressure and throttle valve position and calculates with an analog computer how many milliseconds the fuel injectors should stay open per revolution.

The .991 is the low-compression version of the .981.

Power output of .991:  at 6000 rpm.

Applications:
 1972-1976 280E (W114)
 1972-1976 280CE (W114)

M110.982 / M110.992
The .992 is the low-compression version of the .982.

Power output of .982:  at 6000 rpm.
Power output of .992:  at 6000 rpm.

Applications:
 1973-1976 Mercedes-Benz 280SL
 1973-1976 Mercedes-Benz 280SLC

M110.983 / M110.993
The .993 is the low-compression version of the .983.

Power output of .983:  at 6000 rpm.
Power output of .993:  at 6000 rpm.

Applications:
 1972-1975 280SE (W116)
 1972-1975 280SEL (W116)

M110.984
The M110.984 was the first engine with the new Bosch K-Jetronic injection. This system is mechanical. The air that is taken in is weighed to then determine the amount of fuel to inject.

Power output:  at 6000 rpm up to April 1978;  at 5800 rpm from April 1978.

Applications:
 1975-1981 280E (W123)
 1975-1981 280CE (W123)
 1975-1981 280TE (W123)

M110.985
Power output:  at 6000 rpm up to April 1978;  at 5800 rpm from April 1978.

Applications:
 1976-1980 280SE (W116)
 1976-1980 280SEL (W116)

M110.986
Power output:  at 6000 rpm up to April 1978;  at 5800 rpm from April 1978.

Applications:
 1976-1985 280SL (R107)
 1976-1981 280SLC (C107)

M110.987
Power output:  at 5800 rpm.
Maximum torque:  at 4500 rpm.
Compression ratio: 9.0:1

Applications:
 1979-1985 280SE (W126)
 1979-1985 280SEL (W126)

M110.988
The compression ratio was 9.0:1.

Applications:
 1978-1986 280E (W123)
 1978-1986 280TE (W123)
 1978-1986 280CE (W123)

M110.989
Power output:  at 5800 rpm.
Maximum torque:  at 4500 rpm.
The compression ratio: 9.0:1.

Applications:
 1981.10-1985 280SE (W126)
 1981.10-1985 280SEL (W126)

M110.990
Power output:  at 5800 rpm.

Applications:
 1976-1985 280SL (R107)
 1976-1981 280SLC (C107)

M110.994
This engine was specifically produced for the G-Class Geländewagen. It has a low compression ratio. It uses K-Jetronic.

Power output:  at 5250 rpm up to 1984;  at 5250 rpm from 1984.
Torque:  at 4250 rpm.

Applications:
 1979-1989 280GE (W460)

M110.998/995 by AMG 
Own tuning version of the 2.7-liter M110 engine was presented at the end of the 70s by the then independent AMG division for the W123 models (sedan, coupe and station wagon) and W116 in long and short body versions.

Applications:

 1979–1981 Mercedes-Benz W123 by AMG (280E/280TE/280CE)
 1979–1981 Mercedes-Benz W116 by AMG (280SE/280SEL)

See also

 List of Mercedes-Benz engines

References
 Mercedes-Benz "Werkstatt-Literatur Type 107" repair manual CD, page "M110 Motoren- und Typenübersicht"

M110
Straight-six engines
Gasoline engines by model